The 2018 World Junior Ice Hockey Championship Division I consisted of two tiered groups of six teams each: the second-tier Division I A and the third-tier Division I B. For each tier's tournament, the team which placed first was promoted to the next highest division, while the team which placed last was relegated to a lower division.

The tournaments were a round-robin tournament format, with two points allotted for a win, one additional point for a regulation win, and one point for an overtime or game winning shots loss.

To be eligible as a junior player in these tournaments, a player couldn't be born earlier than 1998.

Division I A was held in Meribel, France, while Division I B was hosted in Bled, Slovenia.

Division I A
The Division I A tournament was played in Courchevel and Meribel, France, from 10 to 16 December 2017.

As a result of the tournament, Kazakhstan was promoted to the Top Division, while Hungary was relegated to Division I B for 2019.

Participants

Final standings

Results
All times are local (UTC+1).

Statistics

Top scorers

GP = Games played; G = Goals; A = Assists; Pts = Points; +/− = Plus-minus; PIM = Penalties In Minutes
Source:IIHF

Goaltending leaders
(minimum 40% team's total ice time)

TOI = Time on ice (minutes:seconds); GA = Goals against; GAA = Goals against average; Sv% = Save percentage; SO = Shutouts
Source: IIHF

Awards

Best Players Selected by the Directorate
 Goaltender:  Mirko Pantkowski
 Defenceman:  Pauls Svars
 Forward:  Artur Gatiyatov

Division I B
The Division I B tournament was played in Bled, Slovenia, from 9 to 15 December 2017.

Participants

Final standings

Results
All times are local (UTC+1).

Statistics

Top 10 scorers

GP = Games played; G = Goals; A = Assists; Pts = Points; +/− = Plus-minus; PIM = Penalties In Minutes
Source: IIHF.com

Goaltending leaders
(minimum 40% team's total ice time)

TOI = Time on ice (minutes:seconds); GA = Goals against; GAA = Goals against average; Sv% = Save percentage; SO = Shutouts
Source: IIHF.com

Awards

Best Players Selected by the Directorate
 Goaltender:  Bogdan Dyachenko
 Defenceman:  Nejc Stojan
 Forward:  Alan Łyszczarczyk

External links
IIHF.com

I
World Junior Ice Hockey Championships – Division I
International ice hockey competitions hosted by France
International ice hockey competitions hosted by Slovenia
2017 in French sport
2017 in Slovenian sport
Sport in Savoie
Sport in Bled
IIHF